Pål Cappelen (born 17 February 1947) is a retired Norwegian handball player who competed in the 1972 Summer Olympics.

He was born in Oslo and represented the club SK Arild. In 1972, he was part of the Norwegian team which finished ninth in the Olympic tournament. He played three matches.

References

1947 births
Living people
Norwegian male handball players
Olympic handball players of Norway
Handball players at the 1972 Summer Olympics
Pal
Handball players from Oslo